Gustaf Archibald Siegwart Douglas (born 3 March 1938) is a Swedish aristocrat, billionaire businessman, and politician. As of August 2022, his net worth was estimated at US$7.2 billion. He has been a member of the Royal Swedish Academy of Engineering Sciences since 2007.

Biography

Early life
Gustaf Archibald Siegwart Douglas (born 3 March 1938) is the oldest son of  Carl Ludvig Douglas (1908-1961), a Swedish nobleman and diplomat who was the Swedish Ambassador to Brazil, and his Prussian wife Ottora Maria Haas-Heye (1910-2001).

Career
After an MBA from Harvard Business School in 1964, he worked in Sweden and was CEO of the newspapers Dagens Nyheter and Expressen between 1973 and 1980. After that he founded his company Investment AB Latour in 1984, through which he now controls security firm Securitas AB, the lock producer Assa Abloy and more. He formed a partnership with fellow businessman Melker Schörling, who also controls a significant amount of Securitas shares and serves as the company's chairman. He is the eleventh wealthiest person in Sweden, according to Forbes magazine, with an estimated net worth of around US$3.2 billion as of March 2013.

In 2001 Douglas was elected to the board of the Moderate Party. He has a long history of political involvement, having campaigned in his teens for what was the predecessor of the Moderates. Douglas was, however, for a time active within the Liberal People's Party. Now he is known as a rather Conservative Moderate with a big interest in education policy.

Personal life, family
His patriline is Scottish, of the Swedish-German branch, descended via two obscure generations, from the youngest son of James Douglas, 1st Lord Dalkeith, ancestor of the 15th century Earls of Morton. All these Douglases were of the Morton branch of the ancient Douglas family.

The Douglas family was introduced in the 17th century at Riddarhuset under number 19 among families of comital status. Gustaf Douglas has later served on the board of Riddarhuset.

His maternal great-grandfather was Philipp, Prince of Eulenburg (1847–1921), a friend of Wilhelm II, whose youngest child Viktoria Ada Astrid Agnes Gräfin zu Eulenburg (1886–1967) married 1909 (divorced 1921) Professor Otto Ludwig Haas-Heye (1879–1959), and had issue, including two daughters. Gustaf descends through both his mother and father from medieval Scandinavian nobility and rulers.

In 1963, he married Elisabeth von Essen, the daughter of Baron Eric von Essen and Louise (née Tamm). Gustaf and Elisabeth Douglas have two children, Carl and Eric. Both serve at different positions within the family group of companies. The Douglas family live at Rydboholm Castle outside Åkersberga. One of his younger sisters is Rosita Spencer-Churchill, Duchess of Marlborough third (and former) wife of John Spencer-Churchill, 11th Duke of Marlborough. Gustaf’s other sister, Princess Elisabeth, Duchess in Bavaria is married to Prince Max, Duke in Bavaria.

Philately

In May 2013, Douglas acquired the only known example of the 1855 Treskilling Yellow postage stamp, one of the rarest in the world, in a private sale.

He is a fellow of the Royal Philatelic Society London (FRPSL) and in 2018 was appointed to the Roll of Distinguished Philatelists.

Ancestry

References

External links
Royal Swedish Academy of Engineering Sciences: Douglas, Gustaf

1938 births
Living people
Stockholm School of Economics alumni
Harvard Business School alumni
Moderate Party politicians
Swedish billionaires
Gustaf Douglas
Businesspeople from Stockholm
Swedish counts
Swedish people of Scottish descent
Swedish people of German descent
Swedish philatelists
Signatories to the Roll of Distinguished Philatelists
Fellows of the Royal Philatelic Society London
Members of the Royal Swedish Academy of Engineering Sciences